Killa Mach'ay (Quechua killa moon, mach'ay cave, "moon cave", also spelled Killa Machay, Killamachay, Quillamachay) is an archaeological site with rock paintings and petroglyphs in Peru. It is situated in the Huancavelica Region, Acobamba Province, Acobamba District. The site consists of caves with images of llamas, lines and people.

See also 
 Inka Mach'ay
 Tampu Mach'ay
 Pirwayuq

References 

Archaeological sites in Peru
Archaeological sites in Huancavelica Region
Rock art in South America
Caves of Peru